Laurian may refer to:

 Laurian, a male name and a surname
 August Treboniu Laurian, a Transylvanian Romanian politician, historian and linguist
 A. T. Laurian National College, a public day high school in Botoșani, Romania